The  is an 8.5 km single-track railway line in Himeji, Hyōgo, Japan, operated by the private railway operator Sanyo Electric Railway. The line connects with the Sanyo Electric Railway Main Line at Shikama Station.

Services
All trains on the line are local trains that stop at all stations. Services operate at 12 minute intervals during the rush hour and 15 minute intervals at all other times.

Stations

Rolling stock
The line currently uses 6000 series three-car EMUs. 

In the past, 3000 series and 5000 series EMUs were used.

History
The first section of the line opened on 15 October 1940, from Shikama to Yumesakigawa. This was extended to Hirohata on 23 December 1940, to Dentetsu-Temma (present-day Sanyo-Temma) on 27 April 1941, and the line to Dentetsu-Aboshi (present-day Sanyo-Aboshi) was completed on 6 July 1941.

Station numbering was introduced on Sanyo Electric Railway lines from 1 April 2014, with Aboshi Line stations numbered SY51 to SY56.

New 6000 series three-car EMUs entered service on the line on 17 May 2016.

References

External links

Railway lines in Japan
Rail transport in Hyōgo Prefecture
Standard gauge railways in Japan
Railway lines opened in 1940